The Hune Covered Bridge is a historic wooden covered bridge in the southeastern part of the U.S. state of Ohio.  Located northeast of the community of Dart, it spans the Little Muskingum River in northeastern Lawrence Township in the eastern part of Washington County.  Local bridge builder Rollin Meredith erected it in 1879, using the Long-truss style of truss bridge design; the single-span bridge was named for the locally prominent Hune family.  Among its design features are a metal roof, abutments of cut stone, and vertical siding.  As a Long truss, the Hune Bridge is a valuable example of nineteenth-century architecture: few examples of this complicated style survive to the present day.  In 1976, the Hune Bridge was listed on the National Register of Historic Places, both because of its place in local history and because of its historically significant construction.

References

Bridges completed in 1879
Covered bridges on the National Register of Historic Places in Ohio
Bridges in Washington County, Ohio
National Register of Historic Places in Washington County, Ohio
Wooden bridges in Ohio
Tourist attractions in Washington County, Ohio
Road bridges on the National Register of Historic Places in Ohio
Long truss bridges in the United States
1879 establishments in Ohio